Y&R may refer to:

 The Young and the Restless, an American soap opera
 Young & Rubicam, an advertising agency
 Young and Restless (Australian band), a band from Canberra, Australia formed in 2005